Needwood may refer to:

Needwood, Staffordshire, a location in England
Barton-under-Needwood, large village in Staffordshire, England
Lake Needwood, 75-acre (300,000 m2) reservoir in Derwood, Maryland just east of Rockville, Montgomery County, United States
Needwood Forest, large area of ancient woodland in Staffordshire, England which was largely lost at the end of the 18th century